Nigel Ross may refer to:

 Nigel Ross (cricketer, born 1953), English cricketer
 Nigel Ross (cricketer, born 1882) (1882–1933), English cricketer

See also
Nigel Ross-Scott, musician in Re-Flex